The 1992 Findlay Oilers football team was an American football team that represented the University of Findlay as an independent during the 1992 NAIA Division II football season. In their 18th season under head coach Dick Strahm, the Oilers compiled a 12–1 record, outscored opponents by a total of 408 to 154, and won the NAIA Division II national championship, defeating , 26–13, in the NAIA Division II Championship Game.

The team played its home games at Donnell Stadium in Findlay, Ohio.

Schedule

References

Findlay Oilers
Findlay Oilers football seasons
NAIA Football National Champions
Findlay Oilers football